Kermanshah railway station (Persian: ایستگاه راه آهن کرمانشاه) is a railway station located in the city of Kermanshah in Iran.

Opening
The station was opened by Hassan Rouhani on 20 March 2018. Dr. Hassan Rouhani appeared in Kermanshah Railway Station ordering the first passenger train to leave Kermanshah for the holy city of Mashhad. Dr Rouhani also ordered the Kermanshah-Mashhad train to leave and congratulated the people of Kermanshah, saying: "I announce the start of the first trip of Kermanshah train from this beautiful city to Mashhad".

See also
 Islamic Republic of Iran Railways
Khosravi railway station
 Baghdad Central Station
 Rahahane Gharb

References

External links

 
 

Railway stations in Iran
Kermanshah